
 
 

Nene Valley is a locality in the Australian state of South Australia located on the state’s south-east coast overlooking the body of water known in Australia as the Southern Ocean and by international authorities as the Great Australian Bight about  south east of the state capital of Adelaide and about  south-west of the municipal seat of Mount Gambier.

Boundaries for the locality were created on 31 October 1996 for “the long established name” and includes the site of the Nene Valley Shack Site.  The name is derived from a geographical feature within the locality called Nene Valley which is itself named after Nene Valley, a ship which was wrecked off the coastline of what is now the locality on 19 October 1854.

The locality overlooks a coastline which faces the south-west.  Land along the coast consists of a coastal dune which is occupied in its north-west by a protected area called the Nene Valley Conservation Park, and in its south-east by a settlement and then by land zoned as ‘coastal conservation’.  The settlement which was originally the Nene Valley Shack Site, consists of single storey dwellings.  The settlement is connected to the local road network by the Nene Valley Shacks Road.  Land in the remainder of the locality is zoned for ‘primary production’ purposes such as agriculture.

The 2016 Australian census which was conducted in August 2016 reports that Nene Valley had a population of 84 people.

Nene Valley is located within the federal division of Barker, the state electoral district of Mount Gambier and the local government area of the District Council of Grant.

References

Towns in South Australia
Limestone Coast